The Tingidae are a family of very small insects in the order Hemiptera that are commonly referred to as lace bugs. This group is distributed worldwide with about 2,000 described species.

They are called lace bugs because the pronotum and fore wings of the adult have a delicate and intricate network of divided areas that resemble lace. Their body appearance is flattened dorsoventrally and they can be broadly oval or slender. Often, the head is concealed under the hood-like pronotum.

Lace bugs are usually host-specific and can be very destructive to plants. Most feed on the undersides of leaves by piercing the epidermis and sucking the sap. The then empty cells give the leaves a bronzed or silvery appearance. Each individual usually completes its entire lifecycle on the same plant, if not the same part of the plant.
Most species have one to two generations per year, but some species have multiple generations. Most overwinter as adults, but some species overwinter as eggs or nymphs. This group has incomplete metamorphosis in that the immature stages resemble the adults, except that the immatures are smaller and do not have wings. However, wing pads appear in the second and third instars and increase in size as the nymph matures. Depending on the species, lace bugs have four  or five instars.
Lace bugs sometimes fall out of trees, land on people, and bite, which, although painful, is a minor nuisance. No medical treatment is necessary.  There are reports in Europe, e.g., Italy, France and Romania, of Corythucha ciliata biting humans and some people have painful reactions, e.g., dermatosis.

Phylogeny
The phylogenetic relationships of the Miroidea are not well established, with various authors treating the families, and subfamilies, and tribes differently. The phylogeny here follows that of Drake and Ruhoff 1965. Members have been found in the fossil record from the Early Cretaceous onwards, with the oldest being Sinaldocader from the Early Cretaceous Zaza Formation of Buryatia, Russia.

Gallery

See also
Gargaphia solani – eggplant lacebug
Stephanitis takeyai – andromeda lace bug
Leptopharsa tacanae - tingid from Mexican amber

References

Further reading

Miller, L.T. 2004. Lace Bugs (Hemiptera: Tingidae). In Encyclopedia of Entomology (J.L. Capinera, editor). Vol 2. pp. 1238–1241.
Froeschner, R.C., 1996. Lace Bug Genera of the World, I: Introduction, Subfamily Canthacaderinae (Heteroptera: Tingidae). Smithsonian Contributions to Zoology, No. 574.
Froeschner, R.C., 2001. Lace Bug Genera of the World, II: Subfamily Tinginae: tribes Litadeini and Ypsotingini (Heteroptera: Tingidae). Smithsonian Contributions to Zoology, No. 611.
Drake, C.J. & Ruhoff, F.A., 1960. Lace-bug genera of the world. (Hemiptera: Tingidae). Proc. U.S. Natl. Mus. 112 (3431): 1–105, 9 pls.

External links

Lacebugs of Britain
lace bugs of southeastern U.S. woody ornamentals
On the University of Florida / Institute of Food and Agricultural Sciences Featured Creatures website
Corythucha ciliata, sycamore lace bug
Corythucha cydoniae, hawthorn lace bug 
Leptodictya tabida, sugarcane lace bug 
Pseudacysta perseae, avocado lace bug 
Stephanitis pyrioides, azalea lace bug 
Teleonemia scrupulosa, lantana lace bug

 
Heteroptera families